Franzoni is an Italian surname. Notable people with the surname include:

 David Franzoni (born 1947), American screenwriter
 Francesco Antonio Franzoni (1734–1818), Italian sculptor
 Giovanni Battista Franzoni (1928–2017), Italian dissident Catholic theologian

Italian-language surnames